Iron deficiency, or sideropenia, is the state in which a body lacks enough iron to supply its needs. Iron is present in all cells in the human body and has several vital functions, such as carrying oxygen to the tissues from the lungs as a key component of the hemoglobin protein, acting as a transport medium for electrons within the cells in the form of cytochromes, and facilitating oxygen enzyme reactions in various tissues. Too little iron can interfere with these vital functions and lead to morbidity and death.

Total body iron averages approximately 3.8 g in men and 2.3 g in women. In blood plasma, iron is carried tightly bound to the protein transferrin. There are several mechanisms that control iron metabolism and safeguard against iron deficiency. The main regulatory mechanism is situated in the gastrointestinal tract. The majority of iron absorption occurs in the duodenum, the first section of the small intestine. A number of dietary factors may affect iron absorption. When loss of iron is not sufficiently compensated by intake of iron from the diet, a state of iron deficiency develops over time. When this state is uncorrected, it leads to iron-deficiency anemia, a common type of anemia. Before anemia occurs, the medical condition of iron deficiency without anemia is called latent iron deficiency (LID).

Anemia is a condition characterized by inadequate red blood cells (erythrocytes) or hemoglobin. When the body lacks sufficient amounts of iron, production of the protein hemoglobin is reduced. Hemoglobin binds to oxygen, enabling red blood cells to supply oxygenated blood throughout the body. Women of child-bearing age, children, and people with poor diet are most susceptible to the disease. Most cases of iron-deficiency anemia are mild, but if not treated can cause problems like an irregular heartbeat, pregnancy complications, and delayed growth in infants and children that could affect their cognitive development and their behavior.

Signs and symptoms
 

Symptoms of iron deficiency can occur even before the condition has progressed to iron deficiency anemia.

Symptoms of iron deficiency are not unique to iron deficiency (i.e. not pathognomonic). Iron is needed for many enzymes to function normally, so a wide range of symptoms may eventually emerge, either as the secondary result of the anemia, or as other primary results of iron deficiency.  Symptoms of iron deficiency include:
 fatigue
 dizziness/lightheadedness
 pallor
 hair loss
 twitches
 irritability
 weakness
 pica
 brittle or grooved nails
 hair thinning
 Plummer–Vinson syndrome: painful atrophy of the mucous membrane covering the tongue, the pharynx and the esophagus
 impaired immune function
 pagophagia
 restless legs syndrome

Continued iron deficiency may progress to anemia and worsening fatigue. Thrombocytosis, or an elevated platelet count, can also result.  A lack of sufficient iron levels in the blood is one reason that some people cannot donate blood.

Signs and symptoms in children
 pale skin
 fatigue
 slowed growth and development
 poor appetite
 decrease in the size of testes
 behavioral problems
 abnormal rapid breathing
 frequent infection

Iron requirements in young children to teenagers

Causes
 blood loss (hemoglobin contains iron)
 donation
 excessive menstrual bleeding
 non-menstrual bleeding
 bleeding from the gastrointestinal tract (anus) (ulcers, hemorrhoids, ulcerative colitis, stomach or colon cancer, etc.)
 rarely, laryngological bleeding or from the respiratory tract
 inadequate intake (see below)
 substances (in diet or drugs) interfering with iron absorption
 Fluoroquinolone antibiotics
 malabsorption syndromes
 inflammation where it is adaptive to limit bacterial growth in infection, but is also present in many other chronic diseases such as Inflammatory bowel disease and rheumatoid arthritis
 parasitic infection
Though genetic defects causing iron deficiency have been studied in rodents, there are no known genetic disorders of human iron metabolism that directly cause iron deficiency.

Athletics
Possible reasons that athletics may contribute to lower iron levels includes mechanical hemolysis (destruction of red blood cells from physical impact), loss of iron through sweat and urine, gastrointestinal blood loss, and haematuria (presence of blood in urine). Although small amounts of iron are excreted in sweat and urine, these losses can generally be seen as insignificant even with increased sweat and urine production, especially considering that athletes' bodies appear to become conditioned to retain iron better. Mechanical hemolysis is most likely to occur in high-impact sports, especially among long-distance runners who experience "foot-strike hemolysis" from the repeated impact of their feet with the ground. Exercise-induced gastrointestinal bleeding is most likely to occur in endurance athletes. Haematuria in athletes is most likely to occur in those that undergo repetitive impacts on the body, particularly affecting the feet (such as running on a hard road, or Kendo) and hands (e.g. Conga or Candombe drumming). Additionally, athletes in sports that emphasize weight loss (e.g. ballet, gymnastics, marathon running, and cycling) as well as sports that emphasize high-carbohydrate, low-fat diets, may be at an increased risk for iron deficiency.

Inadequate intake
A U.S. federal survey of food consumption determined that for women and men over the age of 19, average iron consumption from foods and beverages was 13.1 and 18.0 mg/day, respectively. For women, 16% in the age range 14–50 years consumed less than the Estimated Average Requirement (EAR), for men ages 19 and up, fewer than 3%. Consumption data were updated in a 2014 U.S. government survey and reported that for men and women ages 20 and older the average iron intakes were, respectively, 16.6 and 12.6 mg/day. People in the U.S. usually obtain adequate amounts of iron from their diets.  However, subgroups like infants, young children, teenaged girls, pregnant women, and premenopausal women are at risk of obtaining less than the EAR. Socio-economic and racial differences further affect the rates of iron deficiency.

Bioavailability
Iron is needed for bacterial growth making its bioavailability an important factor in controlling infection. Blood plasma as a result carries iron tightly bound to transferrin, which is taken up by cells by endocytosing transferrin, thus preventing its access to bacteria. Between 15 and 20 percent of the protein content in human milk consists of lactoferrin that binds iron. As a comparison, in cow's milk, this is only 2 percent. As a result, breast-fed babies have fewer infections. Lactoferrin is also concentrated in tears, saliva and at wounds to bind iron to limit bacterial growth. Egg white contains 12% conalbumin to withhold it from bacteria that get through the egg shell (for this reason, prior to antibiotics, egg white was used to treat infections).

To reduce bacterial growth, plasma concentrations of iron are lowered in a variety of systemic inflammatory states due to increased production of hepcidin which is mainly released by the liver in response to increased production of pro-inflammatory cytokines such as interleukin-6. This functional iron deficiency will resolve once the source of inflammation is rectified; however, if not resolved, it can progress to anaemia of chronic inflammation.  The underlying inflammation can be caused by fever, inflammatory bowel disease, infections, chronic heart failure (CHF), carcinomas, or following surgery.

Reflecting this link between iron bioavailability and bacterial growth, the taking of oral iron supplements in excess of 200 mg/day causes a relative overabundance of iron that can alter the types of bacteria that are present within the gut. There have been concerns regarding parenteral iron being administered whilst bacteremia is present, although this has not been borne out in clinical practice.  A moderate iron deficiency, in contrast, can provide protection against acute infection, especially against organisms that reside within hepatocytes and macrophages, such as malaria and tuberculosis. This is mainly beneficial in regions with a high prevalence of these diseases and where standard treatment is unavailable.

Diagnosis
 A complete blood count can reveal microcytic anemia, although this is not always presenteven when iron deficiency progresses to iron-deficiency anemia.
 Low serum ferritin (see below)
 Low serum iron
 High TIBC (total iron binding capacity), although this can be elevated in cases of anemia of chronic inflammation.
 It is possible that the fecal occult blood test might be positive, if iron deficiency is the result of gastrointestinal bleeding; although the sensitivity of the test may mean that in some cases it will be negative even with enteral blood loss.

As always, laboratory values have to be interpreted with the lab's reference values in mind and considering all aspects of the individual clinical situation.

Serum ferritin can be elevated in inflammatory conditions; so a normal serum ferritin may not always exclude iron deficiency, and the utility is improved by taking a concurrent C-reactive protein (CRP). The level of serum ferritin that is viewed as "high" depends on the condition. For example, in inflammatory bowel disease the threshold is 100, where as in chronic heart failure (CHF) the levels are 200.

Treatment
Before commencing treatment, there should be definitive diagnosis of the underlying cause for iron deficiency.  This is particularly the case in older patients, who are most susceptible to colorectal cancer and the gastrointestinal bleeding it often causes. In adults, 60% of patients with iron-deficiency anemia may have underlying gastrointestinal disorders leading to chronic blood loss.
It is likely that the cause of the iron deficiency will need treatment as well.

Upon diagnosis, the condition can be treated with iron supplements. The choice of supplement will depend upon both the severity of the condition, the required speed of improvement (e.g. if awaiting elective surgery) and the likelihood of treatment being effective (e.g. if the patient has underlying IBD, is undergoing dialysis, or is having ESA therapy).

Examples of oral iron that are often used are ferrous sulfate, ferrous gluconate, or amino acid chelate tablets. Recent research suggests the replacement dose of iron, at least in the elderly with iron deficiency, may be as little as 15 mg per day of elemental iron.

Low-certainty evidence suggests that IBD-related anemia treatment with Intravenous (IV) iron infusion may be more effective than oral iron therapy, with fewer people needing to stop treatment early due to adverse effects.  The type of iron preparation may be an important determinant of clinical benefit. Moderate-certainty evidence suggests response to treatment may be higher when IV ferric carboxymaltose, rather than IV iron sucrose preparation is used, despite very-low certainty evidence of increased adverse effects, including bleeding, in those receiving ferric carboxymaltose treatment. 

Ferric maltol, marketed as Accrufer and Ferracru, is available in oral and IV preparations. When used as a treatment for IBD-related anemia, very low certainty evidence suggests a marked benefit with oral ferric maltol compared with placebo. However it was unclear whether the IV preparation was more effective than oral ferric maltol. 

A Cochrane review of controlled trials comparing intravenous (IV) iron therapy with oral iron supplements in people with chronic kidney disease, found low-certainty evidence that people receiving IV-iron treatment were 1.71 times as likely to reach their target hemoglobin levels. Overall, hemoglobin was 0.71g/dl higher than those treated with oral iron supplements. Iron stores in the liver, estimated by serum ferritin, were also 224.84 µg/L higher in those receiving IV-iron. However there was also low-certainty evidence that allergic reactions were more likely following IV-iron therapy. It was unclear whether type of iron therapy administration affects the risk of death from any cause, including cardiovascular, nor whether it may alter the number of people who may require a blood transfusion or dialysis.

Food sources
Mild iron deficiency can be prevented or corrected by eating iron-rich foods and by cooking in an iron skillet. Because iron is a requirement for most plants and animals, a wide range of foods provide iron. Good sources of dietary iron have heme iron, as this is most easily absorbed and is not inhibited by medication or other dietary components. Two examples are red meat and poultry. Non-heme sources do contain iron, though it has reduced bioavailability. Examples are lentils, beans, leafy vegetables, pistachios, tofu, fortified bread, and fortified breakfast cereals.

Iron from different foods is absorbed and processed differently by the body; for instance, iron in meat (heme iron source) is more easily absorbed than iron in grains and vegetables ("non-heme" iron sources). Minerals and chemicals in one type of food may also inhibit absorption of iron from another type of food eaten at the same time. For example, oxalates and phytic acid form insoluble complexes which bind iron in the gut before it can be absorbed.

Because iron from plant sources is less easily absorbed than the heme-bound iron of animal sources, vegetarians and vegans should have a somewhat higher total daily iron intake than those who eat meat, fish or poultry. Legumes and dark-green leafy vegetables like broccoli, kale and Asian greens are especially good sources of iron for vegetarians and vegans. However, spinach and Swiss chard contain oxalates which bind iron, making it almost entirely unavailable for absorption. Iron from non-heme sources is more readily absorbed if consumed with foods that contain either heme-bound iron or vitamin C. This is due to a hypothesised "meat factor" which enhances iron absorption.

Following are two tables showing the richest foods in heme and non-heme iron.
In both tables, .  Arbitrarily, the guideline is set at 18 mg, which is the USDA Recommended Dietary Allowance for women aged between 19 and 50.

Food recommendations for children
Children at 6 months should start having solid food that contains enough iron, which could be found in both heme and non-heme iron.

Heme iron:
 Red meat (for example, beef, pork, lamb, goat, or venison)
 Fatty fish
 Poultry (for example, chicken or turkey)
 Eggs

Non-heme iron:
 Iron-fortified infant cereals
 Tofu
 Beans and lentils
 Dark green leafy vegetables

Iron deficiency can have serious health consequences that diet may not be able to quickly correct; hence, an iron supplement is often necessary if the iron deficiency has become symptomatic.

Blood transfusion
Blood transfusion is sometimes used to treat iron deficiency with hemodynamic instability. Sometimes transfusions are considered for people who have chronic iron deficiency or who will soon go to surgery, but even if such people have low hemoglobin, they should be given oral treatment or intravenous iron.

Intravenous iron therapy for non-anaemic, iron-deficient adults
Current evidence is limited to base any recommendations that intravenous iron therapy is beneficial for treating non-anaemic, iron-deficient adults. Further research in this area is needed as current body of evidence is very low quality.

Cancer research

The presence of Helicobacter pylori in the stomach can cause inflammation and can lower the threshold for the development of gastric cancer.  In the setting of iron deficiency, H. pylori causes more severe inflammation and the development of premalignant lesions.  This inflammatory effect appears to be mediated, in part, through altered bile acid production including an increase in deoxycholic acid, a secondary bile acid implicated in colon cancer and other gastrointestinal cancers.

See also
 Bahima disease
 CO2 fertilization effect

Notes

References

Further reading

 
 
 Nutrition,Iron (2018).Centers for Disease Control and Prevention.
 

. Zeglam A, Abugrara A, Kabuka M. Autosomal-recessive iron deficiency anemia, dystonia and hypermanganesemia caused by new variant mutation of the manganese transporter gene SLC39A14. Acta Neurol Belg. 2019 Sep;119(3):379-384. doi: 10.1007/s13760-018-1024-7. Epub 2018 Sep 19. PMID 30232769.

External links

 
 

Mineral deficiencies
Deficiency
Red blood cell disorders